The European Liberal Forum, abbreviated to ELF, is a political foundation at the European level affiliated to the Alliance of Liberals and Democrats for Europe Party. Founded in 2007, ELF brings together liberal think thanks, political foundations, and institutes from around Europe to observe, analyze, and contribute to the debate on European public policy issues and the process of European integration, through research, training, and the promotion of active citizenship within the EU.

Compared to other political foundations in Europe, the European Liberal Forum's independent status is much more pronounced. ELF is open to all types of liberal actors, provided they subscribe to the ideas represented by the European Liberals. Additionally, ELF provides ALDE with the scientific input toward policy development, thus contributing to the European public debate, and it presents liberal proposals and views towards the wider public in EU Member States.

Board of directors and secretariat 
The ELF Board of Directors provides the foundation with day-to-day guidance. Currently, the Board is composed of: 
 Hilde Vautmans, MEP, President
 Svenja Hahn, MEP, 1st Vice-President
 Dr Milosz Hodun, 2nd Vice-President
 Mats Löfström, MP Treasurer
 Dr Šárka Prát, Board member
 Marco Mariani, Board member
 Pieter Van de Stadt, Board Member

The secretariat is run by Daniel Kaddik, ELF Executive Director.

Publications

Policy papers 
 Batteries Charging the Future: The New Cycle for Energy Storage, and the Global Arms Race for it by Francesco Cappelletti;
 The ‘Brussels Effect’ Digitalisation and the Future of Transatlantic Relations by Dr Antonios Nestoras;
 Enhancing the Commission’s AI Act Proposal Dr Benjamin Jan;
 The Promise of Magnetic Fusion for a Sustainable Future by Francesco Cappelletti;
 The Potential of Harm Reduction: A Novel EU Strategy on Tobacco Regulation by Dr Frank-Ulrich Fricke;
 Towards a Social EU? A Liberal Vision for Social Policy Beyond the Porto Summit by Dr Maria Alesina.

Member organisations

See also 

 Liberalism by country - for discussion of individual states of Europe
 Liberalism in Europe
 Politics of Europe

References

External links
European Liberal Forum

2007 establishments in Belgium
Think tanks established in 2007
Think tanks based in Belgium
Political and economic think tanks based in the European Union
Political foundations at European level
Advocacy groups in Belgium